Amata is a figure in Roman mythology. 

Amata may also refer to:

Amata (moth), a genus of moths of the family Erebidae
Amata, South Australia, a Pitjantjatjara Aboriginal community in north-western South Australia
Amata of Assisi (d. 1250), saint
Doreen Amata (born 1988), Nigerian high jumper
Amata River, Latvia
Amata Corporation, an industrial developer based in Thailand
Amrita, "deathlessness", referred to as amata in Pāli
1035 Amata, an asteroid